is a video game for the PC-Engine based on the 1980s television series Knight Rider. It was produced by and published by Pack-In Video Co. Ltd, who also developed the NES version on December 16, 1994 in Japan only. The game features sound bites by KITT's voice actor, Akio Nojima, straight from the show's Japanese dub.

Gameplay 

Unlike the NES version, Special's gameplay is featured in a third-person perspective akin to even the most basic driving games like Out Run and Rad Racer. The action is very similar to that of Chase H.Q. which also features a third-person driving perspective. Players have to navigate KITT through and around various cars, big rig trucks, and other obstacles in order to reach their destination and face each level's boss.  However many of the cars on the open road are armed with rear guns and will try and fire at KITT. Jet fighters or propeller planes will also fly by and try to fire machine guns or drop missiles on KITT.

Areas / Checkpoints 
Like many other driving games checkpoints or "areas" as they are called, are very important as one of the player's biggest enemies throughout the game is the clock. Players are given 60 seconds to get from area to area.

Weapons 
KITT is only armed with a pair of machine guns and has a turbo boost function. Unlike the show and other Knight Rider games, turbo boosts can keep KITT airborne for long periods of time. Over the course of the game players can earn upgrades to strengthen KITT's abilities and defenses.

Music 
The game features the show's opening theme by composer Stu Phillips.

See also 

Knight Rider franchise

1994 video games
Adventure games
Knight Rider video games
Pack-In-Video games
Single-player video games
TurboGrafx-16 games
TurboGrafx-16-only games
Video games developed in Japan
Video games set in the 1980s
Video games set in the United States
Video games set in New York City
Video games set in Arizona